Erzsébet Ruda (22 August 1904 – 2 April 1991) was a Hungarian athlete. She competed in the women's discus throw at the 1928 Summer Olympics.

References

1904 births
1991 deaths
Athletes (track and field) at the 1928 Summer Olympics
Hungarian female discus throwers
Olympic athletes of Hungary
Place of birth missing